The Joseph H. Bearns Prize in Music was established on February 3, 1921, by Lillia M. Bearns, in memory of her father.  It was her desire to encourage talented young composers in the United States.  The Prize, administered by Columbia University, is open to United States citizens who are at least 18 and no more than 25 years of age, and is divided among larger-form works (orchestral, choral, etc.) and smaller-form works (soli, quartet, sextet, etc.).  The Prize is one of the largest given to young American composers, totaling $7200 in 2006.

Past winners
 Milton Babbitt (for Music for the Mass) 
 Christopher Bailey (for Six Songs on Poems of John Monroe) 
 Samuel Barber (1929, for Violin Sonata, and again in 1933, for School for Scandal Overture)
 William Bergsma
 Stephen Cabell (2004, for Cosmicomic) 
 Ronald Caltabiano (1981, 1983) 
 Carlos R. Carrillo Cotto (1993, for Cantares) 
 William Coble 
 Glen Cortese 
 Alvin Curran
 Richard Danielpour (1982) 
 Mario Davidovsky
 Jonathan Dawe 
 Charles Dodge
 Emily Doolittle (1997, for Weather Songs) 
 Michael Eckert 
 Renee Favand (1995, for Orpheus. Eurydice. Hermes.)
 Mark Gustavson (1983, for Textures of Time) 
 Daron Hagen (1985, for Trio Concertante)
 Mark Hagerty 
 Kevin Hanlon 
 William Harvey (for Cuerpo Garrido) 
 Joel Hoffman (composer) (1975, for Variations for violin, cello, and harp) 
 Stephen Jaffe (1976, for Four Nocturnes) 
 Pierre Jalbert
 Evan Johnson (2006) 
 Brooke Joyce (1999) 
 Louis Karchin 
 Aaron Jay Kernis
 Kenneth Lampl
 David Lang (1983)
 Paul Lansky (1964) 
 Anne LeBaron (1978) 
 Roland Leich (1933 for Housman Songs, and 1937 for String Quartet) 
 Leonard Mark Lewis (1999) 
 Steven Mackey
 Shafer Mahoney 
 Paul Moravec
 Lynn David Newton (1965, for Sonata for Piano) 
 Paul Nordoff (1933, for Piano Concerto) 
 Joshua Penman (2004, for Aevum) 
 Daniel Perlongo (for Seven Pieces) 
 Tobias Picker
 James Primosch (1981) 
 David Rakowski (1984, for Violin Concerto) 
 Jason Roth (1995, for Second String Quartet)
 Jake Rundall (2006) 
 Eric W. Sawyer (1987) 
 Carl Schimmel (1999, for Capa Cocha)
 Joseph Schwantner (1967) 
 Harold Shapero (1946, for Symphony for String Orchestra) 
 Alexander Sigman (2006) 
 Lani Smith (Co-winner - 1958) for "Prelude and Scherzo for Brass, Timpani and Strings"
 David Soley 
 Anthony Strilko 
 Louise Talma (1932) 
 Bruce Taub (1971, for Variations 11.7.3.3.4) 
 Reynold Tharp (1996, for Drift) 
 Christopher Theofanidis
 Augusta Read Thomas
 Richard Toensing
 Christopher Trapani
 Benjamin Vanden Heuvel (2018) 
 Dan Visconti
 David Ward-Steinman (1959, for Symphony) 
 Hugo Weisgall
 Richard Willis (for Symphony No. 1) 
 Cynthia Lee Wong (2004, for Fates and Furies) 
 Maurice Wright (1974) 
 Charles Wuorinen (1958, 1959, and 1961)

References

External links
 The Joseph H. Bearns Prize webpage.

Awards and prizes of Columbia University
American music awards
Awards established in 1921